Mount Caroline Mikkelsen is a small coastal mountain discovered on February 20, 1935. It was discovered by Captain Klarius Mikkelsen in the Thorshavn, a Norwegian whaling ship sent out by Lars Christensen. It is named for Captain Mikkelsen's wife Caroline Mikkelsen, who accompanied her husband on this voyage and became the first woman to set foot on Antarctica.

References 

Mountains of Princess Elizabeth Land
Ingrid Christensen Coast